Aikido is a modern Japanese martial art that is split into many different styles, including Iwama Ryu, Iwama Shin Shin Aiki Shuren Kai, Shodokan Aikido, Yoshinkan, Renshinkai, Aikikai and Ki Aikido. Aikido is now practiced in around 140 countries. It was originally developed by Morihei Ueshiba, as a synthesis of his martial studies, philosophy and religious beliefs. Ueshiba's goal was to create an art that practitioners could use to defend themselves while also protecting their attackers from injury. Aikido is often translated as "the way of unifying (with) life energy" or as "the way of harmonious spirit". According to the founder's philosophy, the primary goal in the practice of aikido is to overcome oneself instead of cultivating violence or aggressiveness. Morihei Ueshiba used the phrase  to refer to this principle.

Its curriculum comprises various techniques, primarily throws and joint locks.

Aikido derives mainly from the martial art of Daitō-ryū Aiki-jūjutsu, but began to diverge from it in the late 1920s, partly due to Ueshiba's involvement with the Ōmoto-kyō religion. Ueshiba's early students' documents bear the term .

Ueshiba's senior students have different approaches to aikido, depending partly on when they studied with him. Today, aikido is found all over the world in a number of styles, with broad ranges of interpretation and emphasis. However, they all share techniques formulated by Ueshiba and most have concern for the well-being of the attacker.

Etymology and basic philosophy

The word "aikido" is formed of three kanji:
  –  – harmony, unifying
  –  – energy, spirit
  –  – way, path

The term  does not readily appear in the Japanese language outside the scope of budō. This has led to many possible interpretations of the word.

The characters aeteological history can be traced back to the much older Chinese character of  that is used extensively in Traditional Chinese medicine and acupunture.

The term  in Aikido is found in many other Japanese martial arts such as, judo and kendo, and in various non-martial arts, such as Japanese calligraphy, flower arranging and tea ceremony ( or ).

Therefore, from a purely literal interpretation, aikido is the "Way of combining forces" or "Way of unifying energy", in which the term  refers to the martial arts principle or tactic of blending with an attacker's movements for the purpose of controlling their actions with minimal effort. One applies  by understanding the rhythm and intent of the attacker to find the optimal position and timing to apply a counter-technique.

History

The term aikido was coined in the 20th century. Ueshiba envisioned aikido not only as the synthesis of his martial training, but as an expression of his personal philosophy of universal peace and reconciliation. During Ueshiba's lifetime and continuing today, aikido has evolved from the  that Ueshiba studied into a variety of expressions by martial artists throughout the world.

Initial development

Ueshiba developed aikido primarily during the late 1920s through the 1930s through the synthesis of the older martial arts that he had studied. The core martial art from which aikido derives is Daitō-ryū Aiki-jūjutsu, which Ueshiba studied directly with Takeda Sōkaku, the reviver of that art.

Aikido also derives much of its technical structure from the art of swordsmanship.

Ueshiba moved to Hokkaidō in 1912, and began studying under Takeda Sokaku in 1915; His official association with Daitō-ryū continued until 1937. At that time Ueshiba referred to his martial art as "Aiki Budō". It is unclear exactly when Ueshiba began using the name "aikido", but it became the official name of the art in 1942 when the Greater Japan Martial Virtue Society was engaged in a government sponsored reorganization and centralization of Japanese martial arts.

Religious influences

After Ueshiba left Hokkaidō in 1919, he met and was profoundly influenced by Onisaburo Deguchi, the spiritual leader of the Ōmoto-kyō religion (a neo-Shinto movement) in Ayabe. One of the primary features of Ōmoto-kyō is its emphasis on the attainment of utopia during one's life. This idea was a great influence on Ueshiba's martial arts philosophy of extending love and compassion especially to those who seek to harm others. Aikido demonstrates this philosophy in its emphasis on mastering martial arts so that one may receive an attack and harmlessly redirect it. In an ideal resolution, not only is the receiver unharmed, but so is the attacker.

In addition to the effect on his spiritual growth, the connection with Deguchi gave Ueshiba entry to elite political and military circles as a martial artist. As a result of this exposure, he was able to attract not only financial backing but also gifted students. Several of these students would found their own styles of aikido.

International dissemination
Aikido was first introduced to the rest of the world in 1951 by Minoru Mochizuki with a visit to France, where he demonstrated aikido techniques to judo students. He was followed by Tadashi Abe in 1952, who came as the official Aikikai Hombu representative, remaining in France for seven years. Kenji Tomiki toured with a delegation of various martial arts through 15 continental states of the United States in 1953. Later that year, Koichi Tohei was sent by Aikikai Hombu to Hawaii for a full year, where he set up several dōjō. This trip was followed by several subsequent visits and is considered the formal introduction of aikido to the United States. The United Kingdom followed in 1955; Italy in 1964 by Hiroshi Tada; and Germany in 1965 by Katsuaki Asai. Designated the "Official Delegate for Europe and Africa" by Morihei Ueshiba, Masamichi Noro arrived in France in September 1961. Seiichi Sugano was appointed to introduce aikido to Australia in 1965. Today there are aikido dōjō throughout the world.

Proliferation of independent organizations

The largest aikido organization is the Aikikai Foundation, which remains under the control of the Ueshiba family. However, aikido has developed into many styles, most of which were formed by Morihei Ueshiba's major students.

The earliest independent styles to emerge were Yoseikan Aikido, begun by Minoru Mochizuki in 1931, Yoshinkan Aikido, founded by Gozo Shioda in 1955, and Shodokan Aikido, founded by Kenji Tomiki in 1967. The emergence of these styles pre-dated Ueshiba's death and did not cause any major upheavals when they were formalized. Shodokan Aikido, however, was controversial, since it introduced a unique rule-based competition that some felt was contrary to the spirit of aikido.

After Ueshiba's death in 1969, two more major styles emerged. Significant controversy arose with the departure of the Aikikai Hombu Dojo's chief instructor Koichi Tohei, in 1974. Tohei left as a result of a disagreement with the son of the founder, Kisshomaru Ueshiba, who at that time headed the Aikikai Foundation. The disagreement was over the proper role of  development in regular aikido training. After Tohei left, he formed his own style, called Shin Shin Toitsu Aikido, and the organization that governs it, the Ki Society.

A final major style evolved from Ueshiba's retirement in Iwama, Ibaraki and the teaching methodology of long term student Morihiro Saito. It is unofficially referred to as the "Iwama style", and at one point a number of its followers formed a loose network of schools they called Iwama Ryu. Although Iwama style practitioners remained part of the Aikikai until Saito's death in 2002, followers of Saito subsequently split into two groups. One remained with the Aikikai and the other formed the independent Shinshin Aikishuren Kai in 2004 around Saito's son Hitohiro Saito.

Today, the major styles of aikido are each run by a separate governing organization, have their own  in Japan, and are taught throughout the world.

The term does not specifically refer to either physical or mental training, as it encompasses both.

Gozo Shioda's Yoshinkan Aikido, considered one of the "hard styles", largely follows Ueshiba's teachings from before World War II, and surmises that the secret to  lies in timing and the application of the whole body's strength to a single point.

Training

In aikido, as in virtually all Japanese martial arts, there are both physical and mental aspects of training. The physical training in aikido is diverse, covering both general physical fitness and conditioning, as well as specific techniques. Because a substantial portion of any aikido curriculum consists of throws, beginners learn how to safely fall or roll. The specific techniques for attack include both strikes and grabs; the techniques for defense consist of throws and pins. After basic techniques are learned, students study freestyle defense against multiple opponents, and techniques with weapons.

Fitness
Physical training goals pursued in conjunction with aikido include controlled relaxation, correct movement of joints such as hips and shoulders, flexibility, and endurance, with less emphasis on strength training. In aikido, pushing or extending movements are much more common than pulling or contracting movements. This distinction can be applied to general fitness goals for the aikido practitioner.

In aikido, specific muscles or muscle groups are not isolated and worked to improve tone, mass, or power. Aikido-related training emphasizes the use of coordinated whole-body movement and balance similar to yoga or pilates.

 
Aikido training is based primarily on two partners practicing pre-arranged forms rather than freestyle practice.

Both are studying aikido principles of blending and adaptation.  learns to blend with and control attacking energy, while  learns to become calm and flexible in the disadvantageous, off-balance positions in which  places them. In more advanced training,  will sometimes apply  to regain balance and pin or throw .

 refers to the act of receiving a technique. Good  involves attention to the technique, the partner, and the immediate environment—it is considered an active part of the process of learning aikido. The method of falling itself is also important, and is a way for the practitioner to receive an aikido technique safely and minimize risk of injury.

Initial attacks
Aikido techniques are usually a defense against an attack, so students must learn to deliver various types of attacks to be able to practice aikido with a partner. Although attacks are not studied as thoroughly as in striking-based arts, attacks with intent (such as a strong strike or an immobilizing grab) are needed to study correct and effective application of technique.

Other techniques, which explicitly appear to be punches, are practiced as thrusts with a knife or sword. Kicks are generally reserved for upper-level variations; reasons cited include that falls from kicks are especially dangerous, and that kicks (high kicks in particular) were uncommon during the types of combat prevalent in feudal Japan.

Some basic strikes include:
  is a vertical knifehand strike to the head. In training, this is usually directed at the forehead or the crown for safety, but more dangerous versions of this attack target the bridge of the nose and the maxillary sinus.
  is a diagonal knifehand strike to the side of the head or neck.
  is a punch to the torso.

Beginners in particular often practice techniques from grabs, both because they are safer and because it is easier to feel the energy and the direction of the movement of force of a hold than it is for a strike. Some grabs are historically derived from being held while trying to draw a weapon, whereupon a technique could then be used to free oneself and immobilize or strike the attacker while they are grabbing the defender. The following are examples of some basic grabs:
 , when one hand grabs one wrist.
 , when both hands grab one wrist; sometimes referred to as 
  when one shoulder is grabbed.
 , when both shoulders are grabbed.

Basic techniques

The following are a sample of the basic or widely practiced throws and pins. Many of these techniques derive from Daitō-ryū Aiki-jūjutsu, but some others were invented by Morihei Ueshiba. The precise terminology for some may vary between organisations and styles; the following are the terms used by the Aikikai Foundation. Note that despite the names of the first five techniques listed, they are not universally taught in numeric order.
 , a control technique using one hand on the elbow and one hand near the wrist which leverages  to the ground. This grip applies pressure into the ulnar nerve at the wrist.
  is a pronating wristlock that torques the arm and applies painful nerve pressure. (There is an adductive wristlock or Z-lock in the  version.)
  is a rotational wristlock that directs upward-spiraling tension throughout the arm, elbow and shoulder.
The knuckles (from the palm side) are applied to the recipient's radial nerve against the periosteum of the forearm bone.
Common in knife and other weapon take-aways.
  is a throw during which 's hand is folded back past the shoulder, locking the shoulder joint.
  is a supinating wristlock-throw that stretches the extensor digitorum.
  is a loosely used umbrella term for various types of mechanically unrelated techniques;  generally do not use joint locks like other techniques.
The classic form superficially resembles a "clothesline" technique.
  is a throw in which  sweeps 's arm back until it locks the shoulder joint, then uses forward pressure to throw them.

Implementations

For example, an "entering" technique consists of movements inward towards , while a  technique uses a pivoting motion.
Finally, most techniques can be performed while in a seated posture.

From these few basic techniques, there are numerous of possible implementations. For example,  can be applied to an opponent moving forward with a strike (perhaps with an  type of movement to redirect the incoming force), or to an opponent who has already struck and is now moving back to reestablish distance (perhaps an  version).

 are strikes (or feints) employed during an aikido technique. Some view  as attacks against "vital points" meant to cause damage in and of themselves. For instance, Gozo Shioda described using  in a brawl to quickly down a gang's leader. Others consider , especially to the face, to be methods of distraction meant to enable other techniques; a strike, even if it is blocked, can startle the target and break their concentration. Additionally, the target may also become unbalanced while attempting to avoid a strike (by jerking the head back, for example) which may allow for an easier throw.

Weapons

Weapons training in aikido traditionally includes the short staff (these techniques closely resemble the use of the bayonet, or Jūkendō), the wooden sword, and the knife. Some schools incorporate firearm-disarming techniques, where either weapon-taking and/or weapon-retention may be taught.

The founder developed many of the empty-handed techniques from traditional sword, spear and bayonet movements. Consequently, the practice of the weapons arts gives insight into the origin of techniques and movements, and reinforces the concepts of distance, timing, foot movement, presence and connectedness with one's training partner(s).

Multiple attackers and 
Freestyle practice with multiple attackers called  is a key part of most curricula and is required for the higher-level ranks.  exercises a person's ability to intuitively perform techniques in an unstructured environment. Strategic choice of techniques, based on how they reposition the student relative to other attackers, is important in  training. For instance, an  technique might be used to neutralise the current attacker while turning to face attackers approaching from behind.

In Shodokan Aikido,  differs in that it is not performed with multiple persons with defined roles of defender and attacker, but between two people, where both participants attack, defend, and counter at will. In this respect it resembles judo .

Injuries

A study of injuries in the martial arts showed that the type of injuries varied considerably from one art to the other. Soft tissue injuries are one of the most common types of injuries found within aikido, as well as joint strain and stubbed fingers and toes. Several deaths from head-and-neck injuries, caused by aggressive  in a  hazing context, have been reported.

Mental training
Aikido training is mental as well as physical, emphasizing the ability to relax the mind and body even under the stress of dangerous situations. This is necessary to enable the practitioner to perform the 'enter-and-blend' movements that underlie aikido techniques, wherein an attack is met with confidence and directness. Morihei Ueshiba once remarked that one "must be willing to receive 99% of an opponent's attack and stare death in the face" in order to execute techniques without hesitation. As a martial art concerned not only with fighting proficiency but with the betterment of daily life, this mental aspect is of key importance to aikido practitioners.

Uniforms and ranking

Aikido practitioners (commonly called  outside Japan) generally progress by promotion through a series of "grades", followed by a series of "degrees", pursuant to formal testing procedures. Some aikido organizations use belts to distinguish practitioners' grades, often simply white and black belts to distinguish  and  grades, although some use various belt colors. Testing requirements vary, so a particular rank in one organization is not comparable or interchangeable with the rank of another. Some dōjōs have an age requirement before students can take the  rank exam.

The uniform worn for practicing aikido is similar to the training uniform used in most other modern martial arts; simple trousers and a wraparound jacket, usually white. Both thick ("judo-style"), and thin ("karate-style") cotton tops are used. Aikido-specific tops are available with shorter sleeves which reach to just below the elbow.

Aikido styles
Aikido styles vary in their intention as due to its holistic nature. The most common differences noted in aikido, when observed externally, relate to the intensity and realism of training.

To counteract this, some styles allow students to become less compliant over time, but, in keeping with the core philosophies, this is after having demonstrated proficiency in being able to protect themselves and their training partners. Shodokan Aikido addresses the issue by practicing in a competitive format. Such adaptations are debated between styles, with some maintaining that there is no need to adjust their methods because either the criticisms are unjustified, or that they are not training for self-defense or combat effectiveness, but spiritual, fitness or other reasons.

Reasons for the difference and diversity of teachings, intention, and forms of aikido can be traced to the shift in training focus after the end of Ueshiba's seclusion in Iwama from 1942 to the mid-1950s, as he increasingly emphasized the spiritual and philosophical aspects of aikido.

Conversely, some styles of aikido place less importance on the spiritual practices emphasized by Ueshiba. According to Minoru Shibata of Aikido Journal:
O-Sensei's aikido was not a continuation and extension of the old and has a distinct discontinuity with past martial and philosophical concepts.

[Ueshiba's] transcendence to the spiritual and universal reality were the fundamentals of the paradigm that he demonstrated.

References

External links

 AikiWeb Aikido Information site on aikido, with essays, forums, gallery, reviews, columns, wiki and other information.

 
Japanese martial arts
Dō
Articles containing video clips